Sawbridgeworth Cricket Club is a cricket club located in Sawbridgeworth, Hertfordshire, England.

The main ground is at Town Fields in the centre of Sawbridgeworth, behind Bell Street, the main commercial street in the town. The club's second ground is situated at The Leventhorpe School, to the north of the town.

Club history

Cricket was probably first-played in Sawbridgeworth in the eighteenth century, however the first definite match was in 1823 when two games were played against Saffron Walden. The town had an informal cricket team for many years, home matches played at Pishiobury Park, until the vicar of Sawbridgeworth's Great St Mary's Church, Reverend Arthur Drummond, formed a more formal club in 1862. The first permanent ground was at Rowney Field, and the club moved to Town Fields in 1877.

Honours

Hertfordshire League winners - 1984, 2003 (Div 1)
Hertfordshire Cup winners - 2003
Hertfordshire Plate winners - 2004
Hertfordshire T20 winners - 2015
Hertfordshire Second XI Championship winners - 1975

Club Records (All Games 1862-2019)

Most Appearances - Ted Levey (1,776)
Most Runs - Ted Levey (43,703)
Most Wickets - Ernie Clarke (1,320)
Highest Innings Total - 428-3 declared, 23 August 2002 versus Essex Tools at Town Fields
Highest Individual Score - Matt Birch (223)

Notable players

Ryan Cunningham
Andrew Richardson

References

Sources
A Brief History Of Sawbridgeworth Cricket Club, 1984
Sawbridgeworth Cricket Club - The First 100 Years, R. T. Furber, 1997
Scoring Records of Sawbridgeworth Cricket Club, Richard M. White, 1984–2006
Harlow Citizen Newspaper, 15 December 1967.

External links
 Sawbridgeworth Cricket Club

English club cricket teams
1862 establishments in England
Sawbridgeworth